Ashley Nathaniel-George (born 14 June 1995) is a professional footballer who plays as a winger for Maidenhead United. Born in England, he represents the Antigua and Barbuda national team.

Club career

Early career
Born in Brent, Nathaniel-George began his career with Arsenal but was released when he was 14 and went onto feature for Watford and Wycombe Wanderers before joining non-league side Wealdstone via a scholarship programme. He then played for Potters Bar Town in late 2015 and went on to feature fifteen times in his first campaign. During his second season with the Hertfordshire-based side he scored seventeen times in all competitions. Nathaniel-George made the move to Isthmian League Premier Division side Hendon in July 2017 and scored thirteen times, including twice in their play-off campaign.

Crawley Town
On 11 June 2018, Nathaniel-George agreed to join League Two side Crawley Town. He made his professional debut on 14 August, coming on as an 81st-minute substitute for Panutche Camará in a 2–1 defeat at Bristol Rovers in the first round of the EFL Cup. Nathaniel-George signed a new two-year contract with the club in June 2020.

Southend United
On 5 October 2020, Nathaniel-George joined Southend United for an undisclosed fee. Blues boss Mark Molesley was thrilled to get the signing over the line, saying: “Ash is another exciting player. He’s got really good attributes, he’s skillful, very quick and exciting so I think he’s one that will have people on the edge of their seat. He signed an extended contract with the club in December 2020. In April 2021, Nathaniel-George suffered a knee injury which required surgery. He returned to training in January 2022. On 11 February 2022, Nathaniel-George joined National League South side Ebbsfleet United on a one-month loan deal. He was released at the end of the season.

Torquay United
In August 2022 he was registered with Torquay United after trialing with the club. He made one appearance for the Gulls on the opening day of the season.

Maidenhead United
Nathaniel-George joined Maidenhead United on a permanent contract on 2 September 2022.

International career
He made his international debut for Antigua and Barbuda on 3 June 2022.

Style of play
Nathaniel-George plays as a winger and is known for his pace.

Career statistics

Club

International

References

1995 births
Living people
Footballers from Greater London
Antigua and Barbuda footballers
Antigua and Barbuda international footballers
English sportspeople of Antigua and Barbuda descent
English footballers
Association football wingers
Arsenal F.C. players
Watford F.C. players
Wycombe Wanderers F.C. players
Wealdstone F.C. players
Potters Bar Town F.C. players
Hendon F.C. players
Crawley Town F.C. players
Southend United F.C. players
Ebbsfleet United F.C. players
Torquay United F.C. players
Maidenhead United F.C. players
Southern Football League players
Isthmian League players
English Football League players
National League (English football) players
Black British sportspeople